Pig City is an animated television series co-produced by CinéGroupe, AnimaKids, and Red Rover Studios in association with Merchandising München and original networks Teletoon in Canada, ProSieben in Germany, and Fox Kids internationally.

About
The show features a teenage country pig (Mikey) moving to the big city to live with his wealthy cousins (Martha and Reggie). Thirty-nine half-hour episodes have been produced.

Cast 
Thor Bishopric as Mikey
Philip Lemaistre as Reggie
Emma Campbell as Martha
Michael Yarmush as E. Brian
Lindsay Abrahams as Betty
Matt Holland as Dave
Teddy Lee Dillon as Bob
Pier Kohl as Uncle Porter
Jennifer Seguin as Trish
Harry Standjofski as V.P. Larden
Ellen David as Aunt Yardley
Brett Watson as Link
Ricky Mabe as Stig
Pierre Lenior as Principal Hamhock

Characters 
Mikey Hoggins – a 15-year-old country pig that goes to the big city to live with his cousins, Reggie and Martha. He can be described as humble.
Reggie DeBoar – a rocker, complete with his own band, 'Reggie And The Rashers'.
Martha DeBoar – a bit self-centered pig and Reggie’s sister. She is also concerned with her looks.

Episodes 

The episode order below follows that of the original airdates on Teletoon, which also matches the season 1 episode order on Encore+.

Season 1 (2002)

Season 2 (2002)

Season 3 (2003–04)

Production
During production in 2001, the show was titled The Three Pigs. Originally, CinéGroupe's then-owner Lions Gate was attached to the show's production.

SMEC Media & Entertainment in Taiwan (uncredited) and SMEC Animation & Graphic Technology in China were the overseas animation studios for the series.

CinéGroupe's distribution arm distributed the series in Canada, the U.S., Asia, Australia and New Zealand, with Fox Kids Europe N.V. distributing in Europe, Latin America, the Middle East and Africa with servicing through Buena Vista International Television, co-producer AnimaKids distributing in France and Merchandising Munchen distributing in Germany.

Release

Home video
In November 2002, a VHS and DVD volume was released in Canada by CinéGroupe Star titled "Pig City/Porcité - Volume 1". It contained the Series 1 episodes "Wag the Hog", "Hogtied" and "Porkstars". The VHS versions were released in both separate English and French versions, while the DVD counterpart featured both languages.

Although a promo as seen on the release showcases Volume 2 and Volume 3 sets for release in Late-2002, they were never released.

Streaming
In March 2022, the Canada Media Fund's YouTube channel Encore+ uploaded episodes of the series in both English and French. The series became unavailable in November 2022 due to the closure of Encore+.

Awards and nominations

Soundtrack
On December 3, 2002, Les Disques Star Records Inc. released a soundtrack CD in Canada called "Reggie and the Rashers", named after the band of the same name as featured in the show, and contained the songs sung by them. It was available in both English and French.

Three music videos from the soundtrack were included on CinéGroupe Star's "Double Trouble"/"Sacré Délire" VHS tapes with What's with Andy? and The Kids from Room 402 (one music video per volume).

References

External links 

2000s Canadian animated television series
2002 Canadian television series debuts
2004 Canadian television series endings
2000s French animated television series
2002 French television series debuts
2004 French television series endings
Canadian children's animated comedy television series
English-language television shows
Teletoon original programming
Animated television series about pigs
2000s Canadian high school television series
Teen animated television series